Bruno Neves (5 September 1981 – 11 May 2008) was a Portuguese professional road racing cyclist born in Oliveira de Azeméis. He was one of the best sprinters of the Portuguese peloton, having won one stage in the Volta a Portugal. He was also the winner of the green jersey of the Tour de Avenir, in 2006.

On 11 May 2008 Neves was involved in an accident during the Clássica de Amarante, when he was wearing the leader jersey. He was believed to have died from severe injuries caused by the crash, but it was later revealed that he suffered a heart attack while riding his bike, causing the crash. He died shortly before reaching the hospital.

See also
List of professional cyclists who died during a race

References

External links

Portuguese male cyclists
1981 births
2008 deaths
Cyclists who died while racing
Sport deaths in Portugal
People from Oliveira de Azeméis
Sportspeople from Aveiro District